Xibu is the chief town of Dongshan County, in Zhangzhou, Fujian, China. It is the county seat of the Dongshan County Government, Lower People's Court and local branches of the CPC and PSB.

By convention, Xibu is often referred to as Dongshan.

Township-level divisions of Fujian